Triffyn Farfog (born c.

Triffyn married Gwledyr, the heiress of the British kings of Dyfed, in the mid-5th century and inherited the kingdom..

He was the reputed father of King Aergol Lawhir. His fraternal nephew, Cormac mac Urb, was the grandfather of Brychan Brycheiniog, eponymous founder of Brycheiniog.

References

380s births
5th-century deaths
Monarchs of Dyfed
5th-century rulers in Europe